Douglass Houghton Falls (also known as Houghton-Douglass Falls, Douglass Falls or Houghton Falls) is a waterfall in the U.S. state of Michigan. At  from the top  to its base, it is Michigan's tallest waterfall. It is located in the state's Upper Peninsula between the villages of Laurium and Lake Linden just off Highway M-26. Prior to 2018, the waterfall was privately owned and access to the waterfall was restricted due to its dangerous geological makeup. The waterfall is situated in a deep gorge that is flanked by sharp loose rock. Multiple deaths have been reported at this location; the most recent one was in September 2011. Douglass Houghton, for whom Douglass Houghton Falls is named, was Michigan's first geologist.

Houghton Douglass Falls is currently projected to open as a Michigan state park and veterans memorial. Purchasing was approved by Rick Snyder in 2016.  The land was sold to the Michigan Department of Natural Resources by the property owner, Jim Kuusisto, in September 2018 for $300,000 (equivalent to $ in ).  The property includes  of land along Hammell Creek and frontage along M-26.

References 

Waterfalls of Michigan
Houghton County, Michigan